"Together" is a song by English synth-pop duo Pet Shop Boys from their greatest hits album, Ultimate (2010). It was released by Parlophone as a digital download on 24 October 2010 and as a physical release on 29 November 2010.

The song received its first play on UK radio on 22 October 2010 during Ken Bruce's show on BBC Radio 2. It was the third Pet Shop Boys single to miss the top 40 of the UK Singles Chart, reaching number 58 on 11 December 2010. It was co-written and produced by Tim Powell, formerly of Xenomania.

The song features an almost completely electronic arrangement in  time, one of the very few songs in the band's catalogue to feature an odd-numbered time signature. According to a statement by Neil Tennant at the time, he and Chris Lowe wrote it that way because they were fascinated by the Viennese waltzes written by Johann Strauss II; Tennant noted that the beat of the song is something Strauss may have come up with if he were alive today.

The video for "Together" was shot in Estonia, in Tallinn and Maardu, by Peeter Rebane. It features a large group of male and female dancers engaging in both classical ballet and contemporary dance styles to the beat of the song. Tennant and Lowe appear briefly as behind-the-scenes spectators of a dance show by the group, and at the very end of the video.

Track listings
CD single
"Together" (radio mix) – 3:30
"West End Girls" (Grum remix) – 5:33

CD maxi single
"Together" (Ultimate mix) – 3:32
"Glad All Over" – 3:27
"I Cried for Us" – 3:48
"Together" (extended mix) – 6:56

Digital 1-track
"Together" (Ultimate mix) – 3:32

Digital 2-track
"Together" (radio mix) – 3:30
West End girls (Grum remix) – 5:33

Digital 3-track
"Together" (Pepptalk mix) – 6:46
"Together" (Ultrabeat mix) – 3:41
"West End Girls" (Grum dub mix) – 5:34

Digital 4-track
"Together" (Ultimate mix) – 3:32
"Glad All Over" – 3:27
"I Cried for Us" – 3:48
"Together" (extended mix) – 6:56

Digital video
"Together" (video)

Charts

References

2010 singles
2010 songs
Parlophone singles
Pet Shop Boys songs
Songs written by Chris Lowe
Songs written by Neil Tennant
Songs written by Tim Powell (producer)